Melanie Field (born February 18, 1988) is an American actress and singer, known for her roles as Heather Chandler on the reboot series of Heathers, Kaitlin on Florida Girls, Sunrise on You, and Jo Deluca on the Amazon series A League of Their Own.

Career
Melanie Field graduated with a Master's Degree from Yale School of Drama in 2016. She gained recognition for being cast as Heather Chandler in the television adaptation of Heathers, a role originated by the late Kim Walker. The series was met with controversy and was cancelled after a single, hastily aired season.

In 2019, Field had a recurring role in the Netflix series You as Sunrise, a stay at home mommy-blogger. That same year she starred in Florida Girls as Kaitlin, the leader of a quartet of girls looking to make something of themselves. Her character is described as a "badass". She was later cast as Bitsy Sussman in The Angel of Darkness, the sequel series of The Alienist.

In 2020, Field was cast in Amazon's comedy pilot A League of Their Own as Jo Deluca.

In 2022, Field revealed that she is Queer in an article for autostraddle.com.

Filmography

References

External links

Living people
1988 births
Actresses from Philadelphia
Actresses from Pennsylvania
queer women
American queer actresses